Reza Amrollahi is a physicist and professor.

Biography 
He was the professor of some of the Iranian universities such as Khaje Nasir University and Amir Kabir university. Reza Amrollahi was the president of the Atomic Energy Organization of Iran and the second in the administration of President of Iran from 1981 to 1997.

See also 
 Atomic Energy Organization of Iran

References 
 Reza Amrollahi at Amirkabir University of Technology
 Yazd university website

1954 births
Iranian physicists
Living people
Executives of Construction Party politicians
Presidents of the Atomic Energy Organization of Iran